The 509th Bomb Wing (509 BW) is a United States Air Force unit assigned to the Air Force Global Strike Command, Eighth Air Force.   It is stationed at Whiteman Air Force Base, Missouri.

The 509 BW is the host unit at Whiteman, and operates the B-2 Spirit stealth bomber.   The wing can launch combat sorties directly from Missouri to any spot on the globe, engaging adversaries with large payloads of traditional or precision-guided munitions.

The wing's 509th Operations Group can trace its heritage back to the 509th Composite Group, when during WW2, two of its B-29 Superfortress bombers dropped the two atomic bombs that helped end the war in the pacific.

The 509th BW led the way for America's first military response following the terrorist attacks on New York City and Washington D.C. on 11 September 2001. B-2 bombers were the first U.S. aircraft to enter Afghan airspace in October 2001, paving the way for other coalition aircraft to engage Taliban and Al Qaeda forces. During this operation, the aircraft flew roundtrip from Missouri, logging combat missions in excess of 40 hours—the longest on record.

Units
 509th Operations Group
 13th Bomb Squadron
 393d Bomb Squadron
 509th Operations Support Squadron

 509th Maintenance Group
 709th Munitions Squadron
 509th Munitions Squadron
 509th Maintenance Operations Squadron
 509th Maintenance Squadron
 509th Aircraft Maintenance Squadron

 509th Mission Support Group
 509th Force Support Squadron
 509th Civil Engineer Squadron
 509th Logistics Readiness Squadron
 509th Security Forces Squadron
 509th Contracting Squadron
 509th Communications Squadron

 509th Medical Group
 509th Medical Operations Squadron
 509th Medical Support Squadron

History

World War 2
The wing's 509th Operations Group is a direct descendant organization of the World War II 509th Composite Group (509th CG). The 509th CG had a single mission: to drop the atomic bomb.  The group made history on 6 August 1945, when the Boeing B-29 Superfortress "Enola Gay," piloted by Col. Paul W. Tibbets Jr., dropped the first atomic bomb on Hiroshima, Japan. The B-29 "Bockscar," piloted by Maj. Charles Sweeney, flew over the Japanese mainland on 9 August 1945 and dropped the second atomic bomb on Nagasaki.

Cold War

The wing was established as 509th Bombardment Wing, Very Heavy on 3 November 1947 and organized on 17 November 1947. The initial mission of the 509th Bomb Wing was to carry out strategic bombing missions using Atomic Bombs at the discretion of the President of the United States.

The wing's mission expanded in July 1948 when it received the 509th Air Refueling Squadron and its KB-29M hose-type tankers and later with B/KB–29P boom–type tankers.  Although aerial refueling had been accomplished as far back as the 1920s, the Air Force decided to make it a permanent part of its operations. In fact, the 509th AREFS was one of the first two AREFSs ever activated. In the first week of December 1948, the squadron began receiving the KB-29M, modified B-29 bombers capable of providing air-to-air refueling for bombers using a refueling hose [vs. today's USAF standard flying boom]. With the addition of tankers, the 509th's bombers could reach nearly any point on earth. In June 1950, the wing received the B-50D Superfortress and in January 1954, the KC-97 Stratofreighter replaced the aging KB-29Ms.

The 509th BW entered the jet age in June 1955 when it received the B-47E Stratojet, the first all-jet bomber.  Deployed as a wing several times in the early 1950s, three times to England on REFLEX deployments and once to Guam, the wing also deployed individual squadrons at other times.  Temporarily had no refueling unit during 1958.  The 509th BW moved its personnel and equipment to Pease Air Force Base, New Hampshire in August 1958.

By 1961 it was believed that the B-47 was becoming obsolete and President John F. Kennedy directed that the phaseout of the B-47 be accelerated. However this was delayed in July by the onset of the Berlin crisis of 1961–62.
There, the wing continued to function as an integral part of Strategic Air Command (SAC). By 1965, its B-47s were scheduled for retirement. Unfortunately, this retirement also included the 509th. Fate intervened, however, as SAC decided to keep the 509th alive and equipped it with B-52s and KC-135s.

The 509th was initially phased down for inactivation in late 1965 as a part of the retirement of the B-47, but instead was converted to a B-52D Stratofortress and KC-135 in March 1966. The 509th was taken off nuclear alert as its B-52Ds were designed to carry a large number of conventional bombs (84 500-lb Mk 82 or 42 750 lb M-117s) for service in the Vietnam War as part of Operation Arc Light. The wing deployed KC-135 Stratotanker aircraft and crews, November 1966– December 1975; with B–52 aircraft and crews, November 1966– September 1969, and with B–52 crews, 1970.  From 1  April to 1 October 1968 and 26  March to c. 21 March 1968, more than one-half of the wing was deployed to Andersen AFB, Guam to support SAC operations in Southeast Asia.

On 1 December 1969 was wing redesignated as the 509th Bombardment Wing, Medium and began receiving the FB-111A strategic bomber in December 1970.   The FB-111A was the all-weather strategic bombing version of the Tactical Air Command F-111 which was equipped to carry the AGM-69 SRAM that carried a nuclear warhead with an explosive yield of 200 kilotons.  The 509th would operate the aircraft for two decades. Won the SAC Bombing and Navigation competition and the Fairchild trophy in 1979, 1981, 1982, and 1983.  Awarded the Sanders trophy for best air refueling unit in 1982.

Over the next two decades, little changed for the 509th BW as it became SAC's fighter-bomber experts. However, a 1988 decision by the Department of Defense to close Pease created major changes for the famous 509th. Headquarters SAC decreed that the 509th would not inactivate but would transfer to Whiteman Air Force Base to become the first B-2 stealth bomber unit. As such, the wing moved to Whiteman on 30 September 1990, without people or equipment.

As the Rockwell B-1B Lancer came into service, the FB-111 became redundant to SAC needs. In 1988, Pease was identified as one of several Air Force installations to be closed by 1991 as part of a Base Realignment and Closure Commission (BRAC) recommendation.  The 509th's FB-111s were transferred from SAC to TAC between June and December 1990, being re-designated as the F-111G and converted into a tactical bomber.

Sole Stealth bomber unit

In 1988, Congressman Ike Skelton (D-MO) announced the B-2 Advanced Technology Bomber would be based at Whiteman AFB, Missouri.  It was also announced that the 509th Bombardment Wing would become the USAF's first B-2 Spirit active-duty wing.  Military personnel began leaving Pease in June 1990, and on 30 September 1990, the 509th was inactivated at Pease and activated at Whiteman Air Force Base as a non-operational unit the same day without aircraft, personnel or equipment.  With the reassignment the unit was redesignated as the 509th Bombardment Wing, Heavy. On 1 June 1992, the Air Force disestablished the Strategic Air Command (SAC), transferring all bomber aircraft to the newly established Air Combat Command (ACC).  The 509th was redesignated the 509th Bomb Wing on 1 September 1991, and became part of the new Air Combat Command on 1 June 1992.

In 1993, after two years of non-operational status, the 509th became operational again.  On 1 March 1993, the wing activated the 509th Operations Group as part of the 509th Bomb Wing's reorganization under the USAF Objective Wing plan. All flying squadrons, as well as an Operational Support Squadron (OSS) were assigned to the 509th OG.    The wing grew larger on 1 July 1993, when it accepted host responsibilities for Whiteman from the 351st Missile Wing.  Its 509th OG received the first operational B-2 Spirit stealth bomber on 17 December 1993 (the date was the 49th anniversary of the activation of the 509th Composite Group and the 90th of the Wright brothers' flight).

Since its arrival at Whiteman, the 509th underwent inspections, tests, and other challenges to insure it was ready to return as an integral part of the nation's defensive coalition.  With the B-2, the wing can bring massive firepower to bear, in a short time, anywhere on the globe through previously impenetrable defenses.  The wing has deployed elements into combat over the skies of Serbia as part of Operation Allied Force in 1999; Afghanistan in 2001 as part of Operation Enduring Freedom, in 2003 over Iraq during Operation Iraqi Freedom, and in 2011 over Libya during Operation Odyssey Dawn.

The wing began to continuously deploy to Andersen AFB, Guam, in February 2005. This deployment provides a continuous bomber presence in the Asia-Pacific region and augmented Pacific Command's establishment of a deterrent force.

On 1 February 2010, the 509th Bomb Wing became part of the Air Force's newest command, Air Force Global Strike Command (AFGSC).

On June 5, 2015, Paul W. Tibbets IV, grandson of the World War II nuclear pilot, assumed command of the 509th Bomb Wing.

131st Bomb Wing
On 16 March 2006, the Air Force announced that elements of the 131st Fighter Wing, Missouri Air National Guard (MOANG), would become an associate unit assigned to the 509th BW. The 131st Fighter Wing transitioned from flying and maintaining the F-15C Eagle fighter to the B-2 Spirit bomber. The final flight of the F-15C Eagle by the 131st occurred in June 2009 from St. Louis's Lambert International Airport.  The unit was redesignated as the 131st Bomb Wing on 1 October 2008.

The 509th and the 131st joined forces according to what is known as a "classic associate wing" structure. The active-duty wing, the 509th retains full "ownership" of the operational assets; aircraft, maintenance facilities, etc. Each wing has its own chain-of-command and organizational structure, but the members of each unit perform their duties in a fully integrated manner. Translation, active-duty and ANG pilots and maintainers fly B-2 missions and sustain the aircraft as though it were one unit.

Emblem
Or, in base a label Gules of three, surmounted by an atomic cloud Proper, between a pair of wings Azure; all with a diminished bordure of the first. Attached below the shield a White scroll edged with a narrow Yellow border and inscribed "DEFENSOR VINDEX" (Latin for "Champion Defender") in Blue letters.

The 509th Bombardment Wing's emblem is rich in tradition. Each symbol on the shield represents some part of the past. The Air Force wings represent the branch of service but are not in the familiar outstretched position. When the ancient Greeks approached a stranger, they raised their arms with palms outward to show they were carrying no weapons – a sign of peace. The 509th obtained special permission to display the wings in this configuration to show that it, too, comes in peace. The atomic cloud burst represents two things: that the 509th is the only unit to ever drop atomic bombs in wartime and that it still uses atomic power as a deterrent to war and defender of peace. Finally, the 'eldest son' symbol (the red 'tripod') shows that the wing is the oldest atomic trained military unit in the world.

Lineage
 Established as the 509th Bombardment Wing, Very Heavy on 3 November 1947
 Organized on 17 November 1947
 Redesignated: 509th Bombardment Wing, Medium on 1 August 1948
 Redesignated: 509th Bombardment Wing, Heavy on 2 April 1966
 Redesignated: 509th Bombardment Wing, Medium on 1 December 1969
 Redesignated: 509th Bombardment Wing, Heavy on 30 September 1990
 Redesignated: 509th Bomb Wing on 1 September 1991

Assignments

 Eighth Air Force, 17 November 1947
 Attached to 3d Air Division after 1 February 1951
 47th Air Division, 10 February 1951
 Remained attached to 3d Air Division Until 4 May 1951
 Attached to 7th Air Division]], 4 June – 2 September 1952
 Attached to 3d Air Division, 10 July – 8 October 1954
 Attached to 7th Air Division, 26 January – 30 April 1956

 817th Air Division, 1 July 1958
 45th Air Division, 30 June 1971
 Eighth Air Force, 29 March 1989
 100th Air Division, 30 September 1990
 Eighth Air Force, 26 July 1991 – present

Components
Wing
 33d Fighter Wing: attached 17 November 1947 – 15 November 1948

Groups
 33d Fighter Group: attached 17 November 1947 – 15 November 1948
 509th Bombardment Group (later 509th Operations Group): 17 November 1947 – 16 June 1952; 15 July 1993 – present

Squadrons
 34th Air Refueling Squadron: 25 June 1966 – 31 March 1976
 393d Bombardment Squadron: attached 17 November 1947 – 14 September 1948, attached 1 February 1951 – 15 June 1952; assigned 16 June 1952 – 30 September 1990 (detached 18 June – c. 18 September 1953)
 509th Air Refueling Squadron: attached 19 July – 14 September 1948, 1 February 1951 – 15 June 1952; assigned 16 June 1952 – 5 January 1958 (detached 10 July – 5 November 1954, 14 June- 5 August 1955, and 27 February – 1 May 1957), 8 July 1958 – 25 June 1965, assigned 2 October 1966 – 1 July 1990
 661st Bombardment Squadron: 1 March 1959 – 1 January 1962
 715th Bombardment Squadron: attached 17 November 1947 – 14 September 1948, 1 February 1951 – 15 June 1952; assigned 16 June 1952 – 25 June 1966, 1 January 1970 – 30 September 1990
 830th Bombardment Squadron: attached 17 November 1947 – 14 September 1948, 1 February 1951 – 15 June 1952; 16 June 1952 – 25 June 1966 (detached 15 March – 19 June 1953)
 900th Air Refueling Squadron: 2 April – 25 June 1966.

Stations
 Roswell Army Air Field (later Roswell Air Force Base, Walker Air Force Base), New Mexico, 17 November 1947
 Pease Air Force Base, New Hampshire, 1 July 1958
 Whiteman Air Force Base, Missouri, 30 September 1990 – present

Aircraft

 F-51 Mustang, 1947–1948
 F-84 Thunderjet, 1948
 B-29 Superfortress, 1947–1952
 B-50 Superfortress, 1949–1951
 KB-29 Superfortress (Tanker), 1951–1954
 KC-97 Stratofreighter, 1954–1958, 1958–1965

 B-47 Stratojet, 1955–1965
 B-52D Stratofortress, 1966–1969
 KC-135 Stratotanker, 1966–1990
 FB-111A, 1970–1990
 B-2 Spirit, 1993–present
 T-38 Talon, 1993–present

See also
 List of B-50 units of the United States Air Force
 List of B-47 units of the United States Air Force
 List of B-52 Units of the United States Air Force

References

Notes
 Explanatory notes

 Citations

Bibliography

External links

 B-47 era 509th BW photo scrapbook
 Whiteman Air Force Base official website

Military units and formations in Missouri
Military units and formations established in 1947
Units and formations of Strategic Air Command
509
1947 establishments in New Mexico